Berthe Dubail (1911-1984) born in Leval-Trahégnies near Binche was a Belgian painter.

Biography 
Berthe Dubail studied at the Royal Academy of Fine Arts in Mons, and at the workshop of La Cambre in Brussels dedicated to monumental painting, she further worked in Paris, at the Académie de la Grande Chaumière in the free workshops.
In parallel to her artistic research, she became a professor in Mons and then in Brussels, and developed a new method of teaching that awakened and respected the spontaneity and spirit of discovery of the student. After an early expressionist and figurative period from 1945 to 1956, she turned to a more abstract style.

Collections 
 Royal Museums of Fine Arts of Belgium
 Museum of Fine Arts, Charleroi
 Mu.ZEE, in Ostend

Honors 
 Order of Leopold II, 1956,
 Order of the Crown (Belgium), 1979,
 A street is named after the artist in Leval-Trahegnies

Bibliography 
 De Heusch, S. Goyens; Berthe Dubail, Catalogue Raisonné de L'Œuvre de l'artiste
  Serge Goyens de Heusch; Philippe Roberts-Jones; Fondation pour l'art belge contemporain (Brussels), Berthe Dubail, 1991

References

External links 
 Site Berthe Dubail

1911 births
1984 deaths
Alumni of the Académie de la Grande Chaumière
20th-century Belgian painters
Knights of the Order of Leopold II
Knights of the Order of the Crown (Belgium)